John Caryll (9 December 1667 – April 1736) was the second Jacobite Baron Caryll of Durford.

A friend of Alexander Pope, Caryll was the son of Richard Caryll (1635–1701), of West Grinstead, Sussex, and Frances née Bedingfield (c.1644–1704), and nephew and heir of John Caryll, Jacobite first Baron Caryll of Durford. He succeeded his uncle in 1711. He married, in 1686, Elizabeth, daughter of John Harrington, of Orle Place, Sussex, by whom he had 10 children, 4 sons (2 of whom married and had issue, while one became a Jesuit priest) and 6 daughters (5 of whom became nuns).

On his death, he was succeeded in the Jacobite title, by his grandson, John Baptist Caryll, the eldest son of his predeceased (in 1718) eldest son, also John, who sold the family properties at West Grinstead and Harting, West Sussex, and entered the household in Rome of the so-called "Young Pretender", the exiled Stuart claimant, recognised by Jacobites as "King Charles III". Charles Edward Stuart appointed Caryll his Secretary of State and made him a Knight of the Thistle. Caryll returned to France in 1777 and died at Dunkirk on 7 March 1788. His youngest son moved to Chicago in 1778. Today Caryll's descendants have two legal branches - one in Texas, one in Washington DC.

Bibliography

References
Marquis of Ruvigny and Raineval, "The Jacobite Peerage", Edinburgh, 1904.

Sources
Oxford DNB article: Howard Erskine-Hill, ‘Caryll, John, Jacobite second Baron Caryll of Durford (1667–1736)’, Oxford Dictionary of National Biography, Oxford University Press, 2004 http://www.oxforddnb.com/view/article/4848

1667 births
1736 deaths
Barons in the Jacobite peerage
People from West Grinstead